Baker-Miller Pink, also known as P-618, Schauss pink, or Drunk-Tank Pink is a tone of pink which has been observed to temporarily reduce hostile, violent or aggressive behavior. It was originally created by mixing white indoor latex paint with red trim semi-gloss outdoor paint in a 1:8 ratio by volume.

Alexander Schauss did extensive research into the effects of the color on emotions at the Naval Correctional Facility in Seattle, and named it after the institute directors, Baker and Miller.

History 

In the late 1960s, Alexander Schauss, who now operates the American Institute for Biosocial Research in Tacoma, Washington, studied psychological and physiological responses to the color pink. Schauss had read studies by the Swiss psychiatrist Max Lüscher, who believed that color preferences provided clues about one's personality. Lüscher noticed that color preferences shifted according to psychological and physiological fluctuations in his patients. Lüscher asserted that color choice reflects emotional states. He theorized that one's color choices reflect corresponding changes in the endocrine system, which produces hormones. Schauss then postulated that the reverse might also be true; color might cause emotional and hormonal changes, and various wavelengths of light could trigger profound and measurable responses in the endocrine system.

In early tests in 1978, Schauss observed that color did affect muscle strength, either invigorating or enervating the subject, and even influenced the cardiovascular system. Schauss began to experiment on himself, with the help of his research assistant John Ott. He discovered that a particular shade of pink had the most profound effect. He labeled this tone of pink "P-618". Schauss noted that by merely staring at an  card printed with this color, especially after exercising, there would result "a marked effect on lowering the heart rate, pulse and respiration as compared to other colors."

In 1979, Schauss managed to convince the directors of a Naval correctional institute in Seattle, Washington to paint some prison confinement cells pink in order to determine the effects this might have on prisoners. Schauss named the color after the Naval correctional institute directors, Baker and Miller. Baker-Miller Pink is now the official name of the color.

At the correctional facility, the rates of assault before and after the interior was painted pink were monitored. According to the Navy's report, "Since the initiation of this procedure on 1 March 1979, there have been no incidents of erratic or hostile behavior during the initial phase of confinement". Only fifteen minutes of exposure was enough to ensure that the potential for violent or aggressive behavior had been reduced, the report observed.

Effects 

Results of a controlled study by James E. Gilliam and David Unruh conflicted with Baker-Miller Pink's purported effect of lowering heart rate and strength. While the results of Schauss's study at the Naval correctional facility in Seattle showed that Baker-Miller pink had positive and calming effect on prisoners; when the same pink was employed at the main jail in Santa Clara County, California, the prison incident rate increased and even peaked compared to pre-pink months, despite a small decrease in the first month. Some researchers believe that the symbolism of the femininity of pink would be a bias in the results of Schauss's studies, highlighting in particular the over-representation of male prisoners in the participants.

In culture 

The band Bakers Pink is named after the Baker-Miller pink phenomenon.

A 2013 book, entitled Drunk Tank Pink, is named for the color. Written by Adam Alter, a professor of marketing and psychology at New York University's Stern School of Business, the book describes how features of the environment—including colors—shape how people think, feel, and behave.

The Canadian artist Kapwani Kiwanga made use of the color and it’s effects in the “pink-blue” installation in 2017 at The Power Plant.  

A chapter in William Gibson's 2020 novel Agency is entitled "Baker-Miller Pink" referring to the color a tangential character, Janice, has painted her living room.

The second album by British post-punk band Shame, released in 2021, is entitled Drunk Tank Pink.

The sophomore album, Harlequin, from Austrian artist Sofie Royer features a song named after the color.

See also 

 List of colors
 Shades of pink
 Shades of magenta

References 

shades of pink
shades of magenta